The tenth series of Dancing on Ice began airing on ITV on 7 January 2018. It was the first series since it ended in 2014 and featured a new set and ice rink, a new judging line up, and a new logo. After the tenth series, the live tour of Dancing on Ice returned from March to April 2018, starring celebrities from the series.

For this series, the show relocated from its previous home at Elstree Studios to a new, purpose-built studio at RAF Bovingdon in Hertfordshire. Creative directors and mentors Christopher Dean and Jayne Torvill became head judges and alternated the role on a weekly basis, joined on the panel by newcomer Ashley Banjo and Jason Gardiner, who returned for his ninth series as judge.

Phillip Schofield and Holly Willoughby returned as hosts, with Willoughby replacing Christine Lampard (2012 - 2014). Ashley's brother Jordan Banjo acted as the show's backstage digital host.

On 21 November 2017, it was confirmed that professional skater Mark Hanretty would return to the 2018 show, replacing Lloyd Jones. Matt Chapman was named as commentator for the series in December 2017. However, he left after the first episode and was replaced by Sam Matterface.

The competition was won by Jake Quickenden with professional partner Vanessa Bauer.

Couples
Coronation Street actress Brooke Vincent was the first celebrity announced for the lineup, on 30 October 2017. More celebrities were announced in early November, concluding with Stephanie Waring on 8 November. On 20 November, it was reported that new professional skaters Megan Marschall and Lloyd Jones had left from the series for "personal reasons". They were replaced by new skater Alex Murphy and returning skater Mark Hanretty. On 5 December, it was confirmed that Monty Panesar had withdrawn from the show after sustaining an injury during training. Lemar was announced as his replacement.

Scoring chart

 indicates the couple eliminated that week
 indicates the couple were in the skate-off but not eliminated
 indicates the winning couple
 indicates the runner-up couple
 indicates the third-place couple
 indicate the highest score for that week
 indicate the lowest score for that week
"—" indicates the couple(s) that did not skate that week

Average chart
This table only counts for dances scored on a traditional 40-point scale.

Live show details

Week 1 (7 January)
 Group performance: "Changing"—Sigma feat. Paloma Faith (all)
"I'm Still Standing"—Elton John (Alex & Brianne, Brooke & Matej, Cheryl & Daniel, Donna & Mark, Lemar & Melody and Max & Ale)
"Power"—Little Mix (performed by professional skaters)

The couple with the lowest votes from Week 1 will go up against the couple with the lowest votes from Week 2 in the Skate-off.

Week 2 (14 January)
 Head judge: Dean
 Group performance: "Wonder"—Naughty Boy feat. Emeli Sandé (all)
"I Wanna Dance with Somebody"—Whitney Houston (Antony & Brandee, Candice & Matt, Jake & Vanessa, Kem & Alex, Perri & Hamish and Stephanie & Sylvain)
The couple with the lowest votes from this week will go up against Candice & Matt, the couple with the lowest votes from Week 1, in the Skate-off. 

Save Me skates
 Candice & Matt: "A Thousand Miles"—Vanessa Carlton
 Lemar & Melody: "Grenade"—Bruno Mars
Judges' votes to save
Gardiner: Candice & Matt
Banjo: Candice & Matt
Torvill: Lemar & Melody
Dean: Lemar & Melody
Despite two votes to save each, Candice & Matt were eliminated due to Head judge Dean having the overriding vote.

Week 3 (21 January)
 Theme: Disco
 Head judge: Torvill
 Group performance: "Last Dance"—Donna Summer (all)

Save Me skates
 Stephanie & Sylvain: "Glow"—Ella Henderson
 Lemar & Melody: "Grenade"—Bruno Mars
Judges' votes to save
Gardiner: Stephanie & Sylvain
Banjo: Stephanie & Sylvain
Dean: Lemar & Melody
Torvill: Lemar & Melody
Despite two votes to save each, Stephanie & Sylvain were eliminated due to Head judge Torvill having the overriding vote.

Week 4 (28 January)
 Head judge: Dean
 Group performance: "Set Fire to the Rain"—Adele (performed by professional skaters)

 Save Me skates
Perri & Hamish: "Stronger (What Doesn't Kill You)"—Kelly Clarkson
Lemar & Melody: "Grenade"—Bruno Mars

 Judges' votes to save
 Gardiner: Lemar & Melody
 Banjo: Lemar & Melody
 Torvill: Lemar & Melody
 Dean: Did not need to vote but would have saved Lemar & Melody

Week 5 (4 February)
 Head judge: Torvill
 Group performance: "Dancing in the Street"—David Bowie and Mick Jagger (all)
 Guest performance: "Rumba d'Amour" (Penny Coomes and Nick Buckland)

 Save Me skates
Donna & Mark: "Time After Time"—Cyndi Lauper
Cheryl & Dan: "Don't Go Breaking My Heart"—Elton John & Kiki Dee

 Judges' votes to save
 Gardiner: Donna & Mark
 Banjo: Donna & Mark
 Dean: Donna & Mark
 Torvill: Did not need to vote but would have saved Donna & Mark

Week 6 (11 February)
 Theme: Love
 Head judge: Dean
 Group performance: "Came Here for Love"—Sigala and Ella Eyre (all)
 "Single Ladies (Put a Ring on It)"—Beyoncé (performed by professional skaters)

 Save Me skates
Lemar & Melody: "Viva la Vida"—Coldplay
Donna & Mark: "Time After Time"—Cyndi Lauper

 Judges' votes to save
 Gardiner: Donna & Mark
 Banjo: Donna & Mark
 Torvill: Donna & Mark
 Dean: Did not need to vote but would have saved Donna & Mark

Week 7 (18 February)
 Head judge: Torvill
 Special musical guest: Camila Cabello—"Never Be the Same"

 Save Me skates
Max & Ale: "I Won't Give Up"—Jason Mraz
Antony & Brandee: "How Long Will I Love You?"—Ellie Goulding
Donna & Mark: "Time After Time"—Cyndi Lauper

 Judges' votes to save
 Gardiner: Max & Ale
 Banjo: Max & Ale
 Dean: Max & Ale
 Torvill: Did not need to vote but would have saved Max & Ale

Week 8 (25 February)
Theme: Fairy Tale
Head judge: Dean
Guest performance: Disney on Ice
Group performance: "A Sky Full of Stars"—Coldplay (performed by professional skaters)
"Could It Be Magic"—Take That (all)
 "Too Good at Goodbyes"—Sam Smith (performed by professional skaters)

Due to Ale Izquierdo having flu, Max Evans performed with Brandee Malto for this show.

 Save Me skates
Alex & Brianne: "Don't Dream It's Over"—Crowded House
Kem & Alex: "There's Nothing Holdin' Me Back"—Shawn Mendes

 Judges' votes to save
 Gardiner: Kem & Alex
 Banjo: Kem & Alex
 Torvill: Kem & Alex
 Dean: Did not need to vote but would have saved Kem & Alex

Week 9: Semi-final (4 March)
Head judge: Torvill
Guest performance: "Shape of You"/"Thinking Out Loud"—Ed Sheeran (Gabriella Papadakis and Guillaume Cizeron)

Save Me skates
 Kem & Alex: "There's Nothing Holdin' Me Back"—Shawn Mendes
 Max & Ale: "I Won't Give Up"—Jason Mraz

 Judges' votes to save
 Gardiner: Max & Ale
 Banjo: Max & Ale
 Dean: Max & Ale
 Torvill: Did not need to vote but would have saved Max & Ale

Week 10: Final (11 March)
 Themes: Showcase, Favourite skate; Boléro
 Torvill & Dean performance: "The Impossible Dream (The Quest)"—Andy Williams
 No scores were issued by the judges for any of the performances.

Ratings
Official ratings are taken from BARB.

References

External links

Series 10
2018 British television seasons